Cedar Creek is a stream in Floyd County and Polk County, Georgia.

Cedar Creek was named for groves of cedar trees lining its banks.

References

Rivers of Floyd County, Georgia
Rivers of Polk County, Georgia
Rivers of Georgia (U.S. state)